Naftali Zvi Yehuda Berlin (20 November 1816 in Mir, Russia – 10 August 1893 in Warsaw, Poland), also known as Reb Hirsch Leib Berlin, and commonly known by the acronym Netziv, was an Orthodox rabbi, Rosh yeshiva (dean) of the Volozhin Yeshiva and author of several works of rabbinic literature in Lithuania.

Family 
Berlin was born in Mir, today in Belarus, in 1816 into a family of Jewish scholars renowned for its Talmudic scholarship. His father Jacob, while not a rabbi, was a Talmudic scholar descendant of a German rabbinic family; his mother was directly descended from Rabbi Meir Eisenstadt. According to some sources such as his nephew, Rabbi Baruch HaLevi Epstein (the author of the Torah Temima), Berlin initially was a weak student. Legend has it that he applied himself to his studies after overhearing his parents debating whether he should pursue a trade.

His first wife was the daughter of Rabbi Yitzchok of Volozhin, the son of Rabbi Chaim Volozhin. His second wife was his niece, a daughter of Rabbi Yechiel Michel Epstein, the author of the Aruch haShulchan. A son from his first marriage, Chaim Berlin, became the rabbi of Moscow, a daughter married Rabbi Refael Shapiro, and his son from his second marriage was Rabbi Meir Berlin (later Bar-Ilan).

Although there was a falling out between Rabbi Berlin and Rabbi Yosef Dov Soloveitchik, they ended up making peace and Rabbi Chaim Soloveitchik married Rabbi Berlin's granddaughter.

The Volozhin Yeshiva 
Rabbi Eliezer Yitzchak Fried, the Rosh yeshiva of the Volozhin yeshiva  (in what is presently Belarus) would ask his brother in law, the Netziv, to assist him in operating the yeshiva due to being forced to deal with pressures from the Russian Empire. After his brother in laws death, Berlin and Yosef Dov Soloveitchik were both considered for the position of Rosh yeshiva, managing the school together until a new leader was selected. Ultimately Berlin would be chosen as Rosh yeshiva, but he would later request, Soloveitchik's son, who had married Berlin's granddaughter, Chaim Soloveitchik to act as assistant Rosh yeshiva for the school.

Rabbi Berlin led the Volozhin yeshiva, then the largest institution of its kind, from 1854 to its closure in 1892. Despite the destruction (twice) of the town and the yeshiva building in large fires, its enrollment increased steadily under his leadership, and the yeshiva would produce a number of prominent rabbinic figures who led Eastern European Jewry until World War II. Amongst them was Rabbi Shimon Shkop.

In 1892, the Volozhin yeshiva shut down. Russian authorities (influenced by Haskalah elements) sought to introduce secular studies into the yeshiva. Berlin did initially accept some secular studies rather than shut down the Yeshiva completely. However, the requirements became more and more onerous with the government eventually stipulating that: "All teachers of all subjects must have college diplomas ... no Judaic subjects may be taught between 9 AM and 3 PM ... no night classes are allowed ... total hours of study per day may not exceed ten." Faced with these restrictions, Berlin chose to close the Yeshiva.

Final months 

After the closure, Berlin traveled to Vilna and other cities, trying to clear the yeshiva's debt.

In the last few months of Berlin's life he suffered from diabetes and the consequences of a stroke. He spent his last weeks in Warsaw, and died there on August 10, 1893.

He was buried in the Jewish Cemetery of Warsaw.

Views and influence 
Berlin had a traditionalist approach to Torah study that was at odds with the highly analytical style of lomdus ("learned intellectual analysis") that was pioneered by Soloveitchik known as the brisker method. Instead he viewed the Torah as something that should be read as poetry, carrying much unspoken meaning.

Politically, the Netziv favored Jewish settlement of the Land of Israel (Eretz Yisrael), then under the control of the Ottoman Empire, he was initially a member of the Chovevei Tzion movement. He would later distance himself from the movement.

He was considered a member of the Misnagdim, Jewish leaders who opposed Chassidism.

Bibliography 
 Ha'amek She'eila ("Delve into the Question", the title playing on a verse in the Book of Isaiah that hortatively reads, "Delve, question"), a commentary on the She'iltoth, a geonic work of halakha by Achai Gaon;
 Meishiv Davar ("Response [in] Kind"), a collection of his responsa.
 Ha'amek Davar ("Delve into the matter"), a Torah commentary, the title resonating off his previously published commentary on the She'iltoth (listed above). See Oral Torah#In rabbinic literature and commentary for context.
 Rinah shel Torah, a commentary on the Song of Songs.
 Meromei Sadeh ("Heights [of the] Field", used as a reference to the tribe of Naphtali by Deborah in the Book of Judges), comments and insights on selected volumes of the Talmud.
 Dvar Ha'emek commentary on Nevi'im and Ketuvim.
 Imrei Shefer commentary on the Haggadah
 Birkat ha-Netziv, Commentary on the Mechilta
 Kidmas Ha'amek [She'eila], being the introduction to his commentary on the She'iltoth (listed above) and also entitled Darkah shel Torah by his son Rabbi Chaim Berlin. Translated into English by Rabbi Elchanan Greenman according to the latter title, as "The Path of Torah" (2007), it treats of the rabbinical history of Oral Law from Joshua until the early Middle Ages. Less well known is a similarly entitled but shorter introduction, Kidmas Ha'amek [Davar], contained in his Torah commentary and focusing more narrowly on the history of Scripture.

Sources 
 Epstein, B. Mekor Baruch. Sections translated as: My Uncle the Netziv by Rabbi M. Dombey. Brooklyn, New York: Mesorah publications ltd. 
 Gil S. Perl (2012). The Pillar of Volozhin : Rabbi Naftali Ẓvi Yehuda Berlin and the world of nineteenth-century Lithuanian Torah scholarship. Brighton, Mass.: Academic Studies Press.

References

External links
 Biography at the Jewish Virtual Library

1816 births
1893 deaths
People from Karelichy District
People from Novogrudsky Uyezd
Belarusian Orthodox rabbis
19th-century rabbis from the Russian Empire
Volozhin rosh yeshivas
Bible commentators
19th-century Lithuanian rabbis